The Family  Eviction Prevention  Supplement was created by the New York City Human Resources Administration in May  2005 as a program to help prevent evictions of families on welfare shelter.  It provides additional housing assistance to Cash Assistance (CA) eligible families with children, above and beyond the CA shelter amount.

FEPS can last for up to five years (with an extension for good cause),  as long as the household maintains CA and FEPS eligibility.  Applicants/participants with a court proceeding concerning the  nonpayment of rent can apply for FEPS through a New York State Office of  Temporary and Disability Assistance (OTDA) authorized community-based  organization (CBO), the Legal Aid 
Society or a Legal Services preparer, thereby avoiding homelessness.

Replaces Jiggetts

It replaces the Jiggetts housing assistance program that arose under the Jiggetts lawsuits.  Families receiving Jiggetts  continued to receive that support until 2007.

Eligibility

Candidates must:
have an  eviction case in court.
be a tenant with one year lease, or Rent  Stabilized or  Rent Controlled.
have an active welfare case, and no one  can be  sanctioned.
have children under 18 living with you.

Payment schedule
FEPS pays arrears up to $7000 and  monthly  rent payments for up to five years.

The maximum  rent that FEPS will pay to a household is as  follows:

Changes to sanction rules

Under the old rules, if one member of the household was sanctioned, the  entire household lost its FEPS benefits for the period of the sanction.

Under the new rules, the family will be able to get the money for the  unsanctioned family members to help with rent arrears if the family is  facing eviction because of the sanction.

Other  details
Individuals  residing in the household  that are    not receiving Public Assistance  (e.g. SSI recipients) must  pay 30%    of their income toward the rent.
FEPS does not  accept rent payments from  third parties.
FEPS  applications can be filed through  specific legal providers and  community-based   organizations   in each borough.
The tenants must pay the amount over what FEPS is paying using their  cash assistance, child support, work income, or from a third  party.
If the tenant has to leave the apartment because of a court or agency  vacate order (e.g., if a city agency like the Department of Buildings  ordered the building to be emptied because of structural problems), the  tenant can qualify for FEPS for the new apartment.

References

Further  reading
Legal aid website
Office of  Temporary and Disability Assistance Policy Directive 05-21-ELI (May 27, 2005)
 Press Release:  State Approves New York City’s Plan on Rental  Assistance. December 10,  2004.
No More Jiggetts? State Launches Rent Subsidy: Advocates praise rate increase, but question new restriction, By Alyssa Danigelis, City Limits Weekly. May 16, 2005

State-based welfare in the United States